Michel Debost (born 20 January 1934), is a French flutist.

Born in Paris, he is one of the well known flutists of the French school. He has studied under Gaston Crunelle and Marcel Moyse.

Debost has won major international competitions. He was Principal Flute in the "Orchestre de Paris". He replaced Jean-Pierre Rampal as Professor of flute at the Conservatoire de Paris. Debost has recorded much flute repertoire on LPs and CD. He lives in the United States with his wife Kathleen Chastain who is also a flutist. He taught at the Oberlin Conservatory of Music in Ohio from 1989-2011.

Bibliography
Michel Debost, The Simple Flute: From A to Z, (translated from French), Oxford University Press, 2002, 282 pages

Notes

External links
 Profile at Oberlin College website

Living people
French classical flautists
French expatriates in the United States
1934 births
Musicians from Paris